Campaign for the North was a Think Tank which seeks to address the North-South Divide and establish a Regional Government for the North of England covering the six historic counties of the region. The Campaign promoted a devo-max settlement and, in doing so, aimed to create a Northern Government with tax-raising powers and responsibility for policy areas including economic development, education, health, policing and emergency services.

Goals of the Campaign
 A Northern Government and a directly elected Parliament for the North of England
 A major reform of local government – removing a layer of administration
 Constitutional reform and a new House of Lords more representative of the regions
 The merger of the North’s 11 police forces into a single Police Service of Northern England
 A ‘whole system’ approach to health, social care and welfare
 Investment in education and the guarantee of a ‘fair deal’ for young people
 The creation of a ‘Bank of the North’, partly inspired by the German Landesbank regional banking system.
 A 10-year transport plan for the North, with electrification and new trains
 Sustainability at the heart of Government and more support for the North’s environment

The Campaign was chaired by Dr Harold Elletson, former MP for Blackpool North between 1992–1997.

See also
 Northern Party. This British political party, formed by key members of the think tank, campaigned for the transfer of power from Westminster to the north of England. It registered as a political party in 2015 and deregistered the following year.
 Yorkshire Party. A regionalist political party in Yorkshire, a historic county of England. Founded in 2014, it campaigns for the establishment of a devolved Yorkshire Assembly within the UK, with powers over education, environment, transport and housing.
 North East Party. A regionalist political party in North East England co-founded in 2014 by former Labour MP Hilton Dawson. The party campaigns for a better deal for North East England generally and is committed to a devolved assembly in the North East with powers similar to those in Wales, Scotland and Northern Ireland, if approved by a referendum.[
 Northern Independence Party. A secessionist and democratic socialist political party that seeks to make Northern England an independent nation, under the name of Northumbria. Founded in October 2020 by lecturer and former Labour activist Philip Proudfoot, the party currently has no elected representatives.
 Cornish Nationalist Party. A political party, founded by Dr James Whetter, who campaigned for independence for Cornwall.
 Wessex Regionalists. A minor English regionalist political party in the United Kingdom. It seeks a degree of legislative and administrative home rule for Wessex, an area in the south and south-west of England loosely based on the Anglo-Saxon kingdom of the same name.
 John Stevens (English politician). Stood for the Rejoin EU party at the 2021 London Assembly election.

References

Devolution in the United Kingdom
Northern England
Political advocacy groups in England
2014 establishments in England